Auckland North was a parliamentary electorate in Auckland, New Zealand from 1881 to 1890.

Population centres
The previous electoral redistribution was undertaken in 1875 for the 1875–1876 election. In the six years since, New Zealand's European population had increased by 65%. In the 1881 electoral redistribution, the House of Representatives increased the number of European representatives to 91 (up from 84 since the 1875–76 election). The number of Māori electorates was held at four. The House further decided that electorates should not have more than one representative, which led to 35 new electorates being formed, including Auckland North, and two electorates that had previously been abolished to be recreated. This necessitated a major disruption to existing boundaries.

The area that was covered comprised what is today the central business district.

History
Four people were nominated for the : William Lee Rees, who had previously represented , Thomas Peacock, William George Garrard, and Thomas Thwaites. Thwaites soon withdrew from the contest, and Peacock narrowly defeated Rees, with Garrard coming a distant third.

Thomas Thompson and Joseph Newman contested Auckland North in 1884, with Thompson achieving a decisive win.

Three people were nominated for the : the incumbent, Thompson; Samuel Vaile, a merchant and land agent, and Harry Farnall. The latter withdrew before the election, and Thompson achieved a narrow win over Vaile. Thompson represented Auckland North until its abolition in 1890.

Members of Parliament
The electorate was represented by two Members of Parliament.

Key

Election results

1887 election

1884 election

1881 election

Notes

References

Historical electorates of New Zealand
1881 establishments in New Zealand
1890 disestablishments in New Zealand
Politics of the Auckland Region